Josiah Frederick Dollin Bowden (1858 – 25 December 1936) was a British fencer. He competed in the men's épée event at the 1900 Summer Olympics.

References

External links
 

1858 births
1936 deaths
British male épée fencers
Olympic fencers of Great Britain
Fencers at the 1900 Summer Olympics
People from Bridport
Sportspeople from Dorset
Date of birth missing